John McCrea (born 1966) is a comic book artist best known for his collaborations with writer Garth Ennis.

Career
In 1989, after a few years of drawing television and toy tie-ins, he illustrated Ennis's debut, the political series Troubled Souls, in Crisis, as well as its sequel, the farce For a Few Troubles More. He later illustrated the series Carla Allison in Deadline.

He broke into American comics in 1993, drawing Ennis's run on DC Comics's The Demon, followed by its spin-off, Hitman, from 1996 to 2001, on which McCrea developed a versatile drawing style equally at home with goofy humour, action, and subtle characterisation. Hitman issue 34 won the Eisner Award for Best Single Issue in 1999. His wilder, more exaggerated cartooning found an outlet with Dicks, a mini-series spinning off from For a Few Troubles More into more outrageous dialect, sexual and toilet humour, published by Caliber in 1997, with a sequel, Dicks II, from Avatar in 2002.

Since Hitman finished he has drawn a variety of characters for DC, Marvel, Dark Horse Comics, 2000 AD and others. Recent work includes Herogasm a limited series spun off from Garth Ennis' The Boys.

On 9 April 2011, McCrea was one of 62 comics creators who appeared at the IGN stage at the Kapow! convention in London to set two Guinness World Records, the Fastest Production of a Comic Book, and Most Contributors to a Comic Book.

In 2012, he started work on the Mars Attacks! 50th anniversary relaunch of the ongoing comic, written by John Layman and published by IDW. He also contributed 15 new cards to the Topps MA! Heritage set and exclusive variants for the set.

While pencilling and inking the MA! comic, he has also found time to pencil and ink issue 49.1 of Deadpool for Marvel, Warpaint (written by Phil Hester) for UK based Strip Magazine and Progenitor (also written by Hester) for David Lloyd's bold new online only publishing adventure Aces Weekly.

He returned to DC briefly in 2013 through their Vertigo imprint for an 8 pager (written by Neil Kleid) for their one shot Ghosts. He returned again, this time to mainline DC Comics, for miniseries Section 8, based on supporting characters of Hitman. Section 8 also marks his reunion with Hitman writer Garth Ennis and the team's return to the series.

Bibliography
 "Fast Forward" (with Hilary Robinson, in 2000 AD No. 615, 1989)
Troubled Souls (with Garth Ennis, in Crisis #15–27, 40 & 46, 1989–1990)
 "Wyrmwood" (with Malachy Coney, in Crisis No. 29, 1989)
 "Her parents" (with Mark Millar, in Crisis No. 31, 1989)
Chopper: "Earth, Wind and Fire" (with Garth Ennis, in Judge Dredd Megazine #1.01–1.06, 1990)
Judge Death: "Masque of the Judge, Death" (with Si Spencer, in Judge Dredd Mega-Special No. 4, 1991)
Middenface McNulty: "Wan Man an' His Dug" (with Alan Grant and Tony Luke, in Judge Dredd Megazine #1.15–1.20, 1991–1992)
Judge Dredd:
 "The Craftsman" (with Garth Ennis, in 2000 AD No. 817, 1993)
 "Last Respects" (with Gordon Rennie, in 2000 AD #1389, 2004)
 "Placebo" (with Rufus Dog, in 2000 AD #1405, 2004)
 "Harvey" (with John Wagner, in 2000 AD #2024-2029, 2017)
The Demon #40,42–48,50,52–60 (with Garth Ennis, DC Comics, 1993–1995)
Hitman  (with Garth Ennis, 60 issues, DC, specials: Annual #1, issue #1,000,000, 1996–2001)
Hitman (tpb collects #1–3 + The Demon Annual No. 2 + Batman Chronicles No. 4, 1997 )
10,000 Bullets (tpb collects #4–8, 1998 )
Local Heroes (tpb collects #9–14 + Annual No. 1, 1999 )
Ace of Killers (tpb collects #15–22, 2000 )
Who Dares Wins (tpb collects #23–28, 2001 )
uncollected: 29–33, 1,000,0000, 34–60
Hitman/Lobo: That Stupid Bastich! (one-shot, 1999)
JLA/Hitman (2-issue mini-series, DC, 2007, ongoing)
Dicks (with Garth Ennis, 1997–2005)
Preacher Special; Tall in the Saddle (with Steve Dillon, one-shot, DC/Vertigo 1999)
Cruel and Unusual (pencils, with authors Jamie Delano/Tom Peyer and inks by Andrew Chiu, Vertigo, 4-issue mini-series, 1999)
Wonder Woman Annual vol. 2 #154–155 (with Doselle Young, DC, 2000)
Superman 80-Page Giant: "How To Be A Super-Hero" (with Garth Ennis, DC, 1999)
Jenny Sparks: The Secret History of the Authority (with Mark Millar, 5-issue mini-series, Wildstorm, 2000)
Bart Simpson's Treehouse of Horror #7: "In Springfield, No-One Can Hear You Scream" (with Garth Ennis, 2001)
 "Trooper" (with Garth Ennis & Jimmy Palmiotti, in Star Wars Tales #10, 2001, collected in Star Wars Tales, Volume Three, Dark Horse Comics, 2003)
The Monarchy (with Doselle Young, 12 issues, Wildstorm, 2001–2002)
Superboy #92–100
Spider-Man's Tangled Web #1–3: "The Coming of the Thousand" (with Garth Ennis, 2001, tpb, 2002 )
Spider-Man: "Get Kraven" (pencils with Ron Zimmerman, and inks by James Hodgkins, 5 issues, Marvel, 2002)
Hulk Smash! (with Garth Ennis, Marvel, 2 issues, 2001, collected in tpb Incredible Hulk Vol. 7: Dead Like Me, August 2004)
Sinister Dexter "Vircade" (with Dan Abnett, in 2000 AD #1431, 2005)
The Atheist (with Phil Hester, Image Comics, 2005)
The 99 (with Fabian Nicieza, Teshkeel Comics, 2007-ongoing)
Theseus battling the Minotaur (one-shot, Lerner Publishing Group)
The Boys: Herogasm (with Garth Ennis, mini-series, Dynamite Entertainment, 2009)

Awards
1998 Eisner Award for Best Single Issue (for Hitman#34: Of Thee I Sing)

Trivia
John McCrea also had a drawing of Toyah Willcox as a Judge printed in 2000AD for a Dredd readers' art page in prog 310.

Notes

References

John McCrea at 2000 AD online
John McCrea on Marvel.com
John McCrea at Lambiek's Comiclopedia

External links

Old site

Interviews

John McCrea interview by PJ Holden and Richmond Clments, 2000 AD Review, 11 May 2005
John McCrea, hitman and madman, Broken Frontier, 7 November 2008

1966 births
Living people
Comics artists from Northern Ireland
Writers from Belfast
People educated at Sullivan Upper School
Male writers from Northern Ireland